County Fermanagh was a constituency represented in the Irish House of Commons until 1800.

History
In the Patriot Parliament of 1689 summoned by James II, Fermanagh was not represented.

Members of Parliament

1613–1801

Notes

References

 Parliamentary Memoirs of Fermanagh and Tyrone, from 1613 to 1885

Bibliography

Constituencies of the Parliament of Ireland (pre-1801)
Historic constituencies in County Fermanagh
1800 disestablishments in Ireland
Constituencies disestablished in 1800